Star Independent School District was a public school district based in the community of Star, Texas, USA.

Located in Mills County, the district extended into portions of Hamilton and Lampasas counties.

Star ISD had one school that served students in grades kindergarten through twelve.

History
The Center City, Hurst Ranch, McGirk, Moline, Payne Gap, Plainview, and Pleasant Grove schools consolidated into Star City in the period 1930 through 1938.

Beginning circa 2006 the district experienced a decline in enrollment and funding. In 2013 the district had 56 students; the State of Texas reduces funding if a school district's enrollment is fewer than 90 students. That year the district's closure was announced. The final superintendent, Barbara Marchbanks, stated that parents leaving the area to find other jobs caused enrollment to decline. The district was consolidated with the Goldthwaite Independent School District effective July 1, 2014.

References

External links 
 
 2010 U.S. Census School District Maps: Mills (majority), Hamilton, and Lampasas counties
 Texas Education Agency maps:
 PDF: Parts in Mills (majority), Hamilton, and Lampasas counties
 Web: Parts in Mills (majority), Hamilton, Lampasas counties

Former school districts in Texas
School districts in Mills County, Texas
School districts in Hamilton County, Texas
School districts in Lampasas County, Texas
2014 disestablishments in Texas
School districts disestablished in 2014